The San Zaccaria Altarpiece (also called Madonna Enthroned with Child and Saints) is a painting by the Italian Renaissance painter Giovanni Bellini,  executed in 1505 and located in the church of San Zaccaria, Venice.

History
The work was mentioned in 1648 by writer and painter Carlo Ridolfi as a large panel commissioned in memory of Venetian politician and diplomat Pietro Cappello; he described it as "one of the most beautiful and delicate by the artist".

It is Bellini's first work in which the influence of Giorgione is undeniable, starting the  last phase in the artist's career, a tonalist one

Description
The work is set in a large niche, depicting a sacred conversation within an established scheme: the Madonna and Child enthroned, a musician angel on a step and four saints placed symmetrically at the sides. They are St. Peter the Apostle, St. Catherine of Alexandria, St. Lucy and St. Jerome.

While the general ensemble is not different from previous works, such as the San Giobbe Altarpiece (which shares the apse with mosaics, for example), Bellini introduced some novelties, such as the side openings with landscape, inspired by Alvise Vivarini  Battutii Altarpiece, once in Belluno (now lost). The colors and light show the new adherence of Bellini to Giorgione's color and mood style.

The egg above Mary's head is a symbol of the creation, perhaps a citation of Piero della Francesca's Brera Altarpiece. The lucerne below recalls Andrea Mantegna's San Zeno Altarpiece.

See also
San Zaccaria, Venice, a 1995 photograph by Thomas Struth
Santa Cristina al Tiverone Altarpiece

References

Sources

1505 paintings
Paintings by Giovanni Bellini
Paintings of the Madonna and Child
Paintings of Jerome
Paintings of Saint Lucy
Paintings in Venice
Books in art
Musical instruments in art
Altarpieces